Bradamante d'Este (1550 - 1624, Ferrara) was an Italian noblewoman.

Life
She and her elder sister Marfisa were illegitimate daughters of Francesco d'Este, though were legitimated a few years after their birth by both pope Gregory XIII and by Alfonso II d'Este. In 1575 Bradamante married Ercole Bevilacqua, privy councillor and state and military advisor to Alfonso II d'Este, Duke of Ferrara. In 1590 her husband had to leave Ferrara after Ercole Trotti discovered Bevilacqua's affair with Trotti's wife Anna Guarini, a court singer. Bradamante remained in Ferrara while her husband settled in Sassuolo. He only returned to Ferrara in 1598 after Alfonso's death and Ferrara's incorporation into the Papal States, thanks to intercession from cardinal Bonifazio Bevilacqua Aldobrandini, a relation.

Children
Bradamante and Ercole had twelve children:
Ernesto (1578-1624), soldier in the service of the Este family, 1st Marquess of Bismantova and count of Maccastorna 
Carlo (1579-1640), monk
Eleonora (1580-?)
Francesco (1585-1629), soldier in the service of the Este family, 2nd Marquess of Bismantova and count of Maccastorna  
Lucrezia (1587-1607)
Alessandro (1588-1606, count of Maccastorna  
Camillo (1590-1593), count of Maccastorna
Sigismondo (1591-1607), Knight of Malta
Eleonora (1593-?), nun
Camilla (1595-?)
Camillo (1597-1645), count of Maccastorna and soldier in the service of the Este family
Margherita, nun

Note

Bibliography 
 Pompeo Litta, Famiglie celebri d'Italia. D'Este, Torino, 1835.
 Luciano Chiappini, Gli Estensi, Varese, 1988.
 Luigi Ughi, Dizionario storico degli uomini illustri ferraresi, Ferrara, 1804.

External links 
Love and death in the age of the d'Estes.

Bradamante
1550 births
1624 deaths
16th-century Italian nobility
16th-century Italian women
Italian Renaissance people
Renaissance women